Rebecca Chavez-Houck was a Democratic member of the Utah State House of Representatives and represented House District 24 through 2018.

Early life and career
Chavez-Houck graduated from Bingham High School in 1978. She later earned a BA and an MPA both from the University of Utah. She currently lives in Salt Lake City with her husband Martin and two children and works in public relations. She is an Episcopalian.

Political career
In January 2008 Chavez-Houck was appointed to fill the vacancy caused by Ralph Becker becoming mayor of Salt Lake City.  Chavez-Houck was elected to a full term in the legislature in November 2008 and currently serves as the minority whip.

During the 2016 legislative session, Chavez-Houck served on the Executive Appropriations Committee, the Social Services Appropriations Subcommittee, the House Health and Human Services Committee and the House Government and Operations Committee.

2016 sponsored legislation

Chavez-Houck passed three of the six bills she introduced, giving her a 50% passage rate. She also floor sponsored two Senate bills.

Chavez-Houck introduced HB0264 during the 2016 legislative session that moved to allow for assisted-suicide options. A similar version of the bill had died in the previous year and it also died in the 2016 general session.

Sources

Living people
Women state legislators in Utah
Democratic Party members of the Utah House of Representatives
University of Utah alumni
21st-century American politicians
21st-century American women politicians
Year of birth missing (living people)
American Episcopalians